The Cyclo-cross Beringen is a cyclo-cross race held in Beringen, Belgium, which is part of the Exact Cross, formerly known as the Ethias/Brico Cross.

Past winners

References
 Men's results
 Women's results

Cycle races in Belgium
Cyclo-cross races
Recurring sporting events established in 2019
2019 establishments in Belgium